Heterocampa secessionis is a species of moth in the family Notodontidae (the prominents). It was first described by Foster Hendrickson Benjamin in 1932 and it is found in North America.

The MONA or Hodges number for Heterocampa secessionis is 7981.

References

Further reading

 
 
 

Notodontidae
Articles created by Qbugbot
Moths described in 1932